Old Scatness is an archeological site on Scat Ness, near the village of Scatness, parish of Dunrossness in the south end of Mainland, Shetland, near Sumburgh Airport and consists of medieval, Viking, Pictish, and Iron Age remains. It has been a settlement for thousands of years, each new generation adding buildings, and leveling off old ones. Among the discoveries is an Iron Age broch, the Ness of Burgi fort.

Discovery and excavation
The site was first unearthed during construction work for airport improvements in the late 1970s. An arc of the broch wall was exposed in one side of a green mound during the building of the perimeter road at the airport at Sumburgh Head. Since 1995, University of Bradford staff and students, professional archaeologists and local volunteers have been excavating the site and cataloging the finds. Excavations have uncovered a multi-period settlement with broch, wheelhouses and later dwellings.

The site is managed by the Shetland Amenity Trust. In the summer, costumed guides provide tours of the site and the replica Iron Age and Pictish buildings. The visitor centre also includes exhibits, and there are demonstrations of ancient crafts.

The broch
The broch still stands several metres high with a battered outer wall face. The broch stands at the centre of the settlement and seems to have at least three major phases of use. The first phase saw the building of the primary tower. The second phase saw a rebuilding of the broch interior which involved the addition of a secondary skin to the south and east part of the inner broch wall, and a set of radial piers to form a new interior structure. In the third phase another building was constructed inside the broch, consisting of six or more curvilinear cells clustered around a central area, with a corridor leading out towards the broch wall to the east.

Structures west of the broch

To the western (seaward) side of the broch the limits of the settlement have been established. The dominant feature was a large circular aisled roundhouse (Structure 12) around 10 metres in diameter. The walls of this building stand over 2 metres high in places. To the west of this was a second building less well-preserved. To the south of Structure 12 was another roundhouse (Structure 14) of a similar size but oval in shape. To the north of Structure 12 was another range of buildings, including one with a set of seven (possibly originally eight or more) small 'cupboards' let into the interior wall. East of this building and closer to the broch, a circular inward-tilting arrangement of stones appeared to be the partially collapsed top of the roof of a corbelled cell.

Structures east of the broch
A slightly later roundhouse (Structure 21), to the east of the broch, had the greatest diameter of any of the buildings on site: approximately 12 metres internally. It seems originally to have had short piers, later rebuilt as long thin ones. There was also a later wheelhouse to the southeast of the broch (Structure 11). A multi-cellular semi-subterranean building (Structure 5) was inserted into the fill of Structure 21, and is considered to be characteristic of 'Pictish' architecture.

Later use
The later Iron Age buildings have yielded Viking-period artefacts suggesting Norse reuse of the buildings. The site was also used in post-medieval times with a 17th-century barn and corn-drier having been discovered. On the north side of the site was a crofthouse of mid-19th-century construction.

References

External links

Old Scatness at Shetland Heritage
Old Scatness, Shetland Amenity Trust

1st-millennium BC architecture in Scotland
Celtic archaeological sites
History of Shetland
Archaeological sites in Shetland
Bronze Age Scotland
Brochs in Shetland
Picts
Viking Age populated places
Viking Age sites in Scotland
University of Bradford
Former populated places in Scotland
Archaeological museums in Scotland
Museums in Shetland
Scheduled Ancient Monuments in Shetland
Mainland, Shetland